The Financial News was a daily British newspaper published in London. It was founded in 1884 by Harry Marks, who had begun on United States newspapers, and set up to expose fraudulent investments. Marks himself was key to the paper's early growth, when it had a buccaneering life fighting against corruption and competing with the Financial Times, but after Marks' death it declined. Bought by publishers Eyre & Spottiswoode in 1928 and run by Brendan Bracken, it eventually merged with its great rival in 1945.

History

Early history

The first four-page edition of the Financial and Mining News appeared on 23 January 1884; it adopted the shorter title that July. Founder Harry Marks imported techniques he had learned in the United States to target those offering questionable investment schemes, intending that his paper be known for campaigning.

The newspaper scored an early significant success in exposing corruption in local government. Marks himself was one of the main authors of a series of articles that began appearing on 25 October 1886 and carried on for nearly a year. The newspaper uncovered the involvement of officials and members of the Metropolitan Board of Works, which ran local government services in London, in schemes to personally enrich themselves. However, the early years saw the company frequently summoned to the law courts to defend libel actions; there were three major cases between 1888 and 1890.

The paper gained a rival when the Financial Times, published by Horatio Bottomley, appeared in 1888. The two papers frequently attacked each other's advertisers, and criticised the investment schemes the other promoted, until a truce was worked out after a bad-tempered dispute over "the Nitrate King" Colonel J. T. North who was developing the Nitrate Railway in South America. After then they continued to compete, but more in the nature of a friendly rivalry.

It was a financially successful venture; Marks floated the company on the stock market in March 1898, with the understanding that he would continue as editor. Its success continued, and at the ordinary general meeting in January 1911, the company announced a dividend and bonus amounting to 35% on ordinary shares; the announcement brought cheers. The paper was among those that exposed the details of the Marconi scandal.

Marks' departure
Handing over the editorship in 1909 to Ellis Powell, Marks remained the controlling influence as proprietor. He suffered increasing bouts of ill-health due to gout and had at least one stroke in 1915, and was forced to cease any active involvement in the newspaper; he died in December 1916. Although he left his interest to a nephew, the existing board fought off his attempts to take control. The Marks estate was eventually sold in 1919, and most of the Financial News shares were bought by John Jarvis. In 1926 it was sold again to the Trireme Trust, although with Jarvis remaining chairman; however, the mounting losses of the Morning Post, which the Trust also owned, forced another sale in 1928. During this period it absorbed one major rival, the Financier and Bullionist.

Brendan Bracken
The new ownership was put together by Brendan Bracken, who had been elected to the board of Eyre & Spottiswoode. Bracken persuaded the board to buy the Financial News and then bought a number of other publications (the Investors Chronicle and a half-share in The Economist among them); Bracken himself took responsibility for the Financial News. Circulation rose in the early 1930s, but the Financial Times was still selling about three or four times as many copies. In spring 1937 sales hit 10,000, but only briefly.

When Adolf Hitler was appointed Chancellor of Germany, the Financial News leader was headed "Heil Hitler!"; it argued that Hitler was the prisoner of the non-Nazi majority in his government, and that the Nazis were highly unlikely to "attempt to base their power on armed force". However, the paper soon changed its line, arguing at the time of the remilitarization of the Rhineland that a stand would have to be taken against German military aggression. Hargreaves Parkinson became editor in 1938.

Merger and closure
During the Second World War, Bracken became close to Lord Camrose, the proprietor since 1919 of the Financial Times. The two privately agreed to raise their advertising rates to protect their finances, and eventually agreed that the other would have first refusal if one wanted to sell. Towards the end of the war, Camrose decided to sell the Financial Times, and arrangements for a merger were put in place. The financial deal was a complex one: the Financial News raised the cost of buying a controlling interest in the Financial Times by selling its own offices and investments, and by a share issue, but could only make up the full amount by simultaneously selling to the Financial Times the copyright and goodwill of the Financial News. Camrose himself bought some Financial News shares to help the deal along.

The Financial News ceased publication on 1 October 1945; the Financial Times afterward at first appeared with the title "Financial Times, incorporating The Financial News". The three top jobs in the new merged paper went to former Financial News employees, including Parkinson as editor.

Editors
1884: Harry Hananel Marks
1916: Ellis Powell
1921: Herbert O'Neill
1921: W. A. Doman and William Lang
1924: Laming Worthington-Evans
1925: Hilton Young
1929: Oscar Rudolf Hobson
1934: Maurice Green
1938: Hargreaves Parkinson

Source: David Butler and Anne Sloman, British Political Facts, 1900-1979, p. 441

References

Sources
Griffiths, Dennis. Fleet Street: Five hundred years of the Press. British Library, 2006
Kynaston, David. The Financial Times: A Centenary History. Viking, 1988

Business newspapers published in the United Kingdom
Publications established in 1884
Publications disestablished in 1945
Defunct newspapers published in the United Kingdom
1884 establishments in the United Kingdom